{{Automatic taxobox
|taxon = Turritellidae
|image =Turritellidae.jpg
|image_caption = A shell of a Turritella species
|authority = Lovén, 1847
|synonyms_ref = 
|synonyms =
 Archimediellidae Starobogatov, 1982
 Zariinae Gray, 1850
| diversity_link = 
| diversity_ref = 
| diversity = 21 extant genera
125 extant species
|subdivision_ranks = Genera
|subdivision = See text
|display_parents = 3
}}

Turritellidae, with the common name "tower shells" or "tower snails", is a taxonomic family of small- to medium-sized sea snails, marine gastropod molluscs in the Sorbeoconcha clade.

They are filter feeders; this method of feeding is somewhat unusual among gastropod mollusks, but is very common in bivalves.

 Shell description 
The shells of turritellid species have whorls that are more convex and their apertures being more circular than it is in the auger shells, which are similarly high-spired. The columella is curved and the thin operculum has many horns.

 Anatomy of the soft parts 
These snails burrow into mud or sand, with their foots being relatively small.

 Taxonomy 
Five subfamilies of this family were recognized in the taxonomy of Bouchet & Rocroi (2005):Turritellinae Lovén, 1847 - synonyms: Zariinae Gray, 1850; Zeacolpini Marwick, 1971; Archimediellidae Starobogatov, 1982; Tachyrhynchinae Golikov, 1986Orectospirinae Habe, 1955Pareorinae Finlay & Marwick, 1937Protominae Marwick, 1957Vermiculariinae Dall, 1913 - synonym: Pseudomesaliidae mahmoud, 1955 (inv.)

 Genera 
Genera within this family include:

Turritellinae
 Archimediella Sacco, 1895
 Banzarecolpus Powell, 1957
 Colpospira  Donald, 1900
 Gazameda Iredale, 1924
 Glyptozaria Iredale, 1924
 Incatella DeVries, 2007
 Maoricolpus Finlay, 1927
 Spirocolpus Finlay, 1927
 Stiracolpus Finlay, 1926
 Tachyrhynchus Mörch, 1868
 Turritella Lamarck, 1799 - the type genus of the family, synonyms: Torcula Gray, 1847; Proto Blainville, 1824
 subgenus Haustator Montfort, 1810
 Zeacolpus Finlay, 1927
 Zaria Gray, 1842: synonym of Turritella Lamarck, 1799

Orectospirinae
 Orectospira Dall, 1925

Pareorinae
 † Batillona Finlay, 1927 
 Pareora Marwick, 1931

Protominae
 Protoma Baird, 1870 - synonym: Protomella Thiele, 1929)

Vermiculariinae
 Callostracum E. A. Smith, 1909
 Vermicularia Lamarck, 1799

Other
 Armatus Golikov, 1986
 † Colposigma Finlay & Marwick, 1937
 Mesalia Gray, 1847
 Neohaustator Ida, 1952
 † Palmerella Allmon 1996
 † Tropicolpus Marwick, 1931

 Palaeontological locations 

 The Turritellenplatte of Ermingen ("Erminger Turritellenplatte" near Ulm, Germany) is situated in the northern part of the North Alpine Foreland Basin (NAFB) and is of interest for its abundance of Turritella turris gastropod shells within sedimentary deposits. The fauna of the gastropod-rich sandstone reflects mainly towards near-coastal and shallow marine conditions. Petrographical and palaeontological data allow for a correlation with this area and the Burdigalian age (Lower Miocene epoch). Based on the Sr-isotope composition of shark teeth in the area, the age of the area is about 18,5 Ma.

 References 

 Further reading 
 Mayr H. (1985). A Guide to Fossils. Princeton University Press, Princeton, New Jersey, USA. (English translation 1992).
 Powell A. W. B. (1979). New Zealand Mollusca, William Collins Publishers Ltd, Auckland, New Zealand, .
 Kiel S. (2003) New taxonomic data for the gastropod fauna of the Umzamba Formation (Santonian–Campanian, South Africa)''; Cretaceous Research 24 (2003) 449–475

External links 

 
 Selachian fauna of Turritellenplatte: Abstract of Baier et al. 2004
 Age and Sedimentpetrography of Turritellenplatte: Abstract of Baier 2008
 Turritelidae species database
 Miocene Gastropods and Biostratigraphy of the Kern River Area, California; United States Geological Survey Professional Paper 642 

 
Gastropod families